Alan William Michael Rowarth (born 24 August 1936) is a former Australian rules footballer who played for Melbourne in the Victorian Football League (VFL).

Rowarth first played with Melbourne in 1958 and despite playing 10 games that year he missed the Grand Final. He made the decider however the following season and, playing as full-forward, helped his team win by kicking four goals, bringing his season tally to 42. Rowarth enjoyed premiership success again in 1960.

External links

1936 births
Australian rules footballers from Victoria (Australia)
Melbourne Football Club players
Living people
Melbourne Football Club Premiership players
Two-time VFL/AFL Premiership players